The Indian state of Tamil Nadu has 23 public holidays for staff working in government offices and banks. They are declared under the Negotiable Instruments Act of 1881. Three of them are national holidays: Republic Day, Independence Day and Gandhi Jayanthi. State-specific holidays include Pongal, Thiruvalluvar Day, and Tamil New Year.

Table

Other days of importance 
These are major festivals or observances that are not declared a holiday by government.

 Aadi Perukku
 Karthikai Deepam
 Mahamaham
 Thaipusam

References 

Tamil Nadu
Tamil Nadu
Festivals in Tamil Nadu
Tamil Nadu-related lists